Starorechye is a rural locality (a settlement) in Lentyevskoye Rural Settlement, Ustyuzhensky District, Vologda Oblast, Russia. The population was 1 as of 2002. There are 3 streets.

Geography 
Gliny is the nearest rural locality.

References 

Rural localities in Ustyuzhensky District